Fintan O'Carroll (who also used the Irish name Fiontán P Ó Cearbhaill) was an Irish composer. He was born in Wexford, Ireland in 1922.  His family later moved to Waterford and this is where he spent the rest of his life.  He died in 1981 and is survived by his wife and six of his seven children.

He composed mostly church music for the Roman Catholic Church, and is most well known for his "Celtic Alleluia" which was later re-arranged by Christopher Walker.  It was published also with texts in several other languages: Swedish, and   French   

The Gloria from his Mass of the Annunciation was included in A historical anthology of Irish  church music published in 2001, and included in an companion recording.      His masses were published in an updated collected edition in 2012, adapted for use with the new Roman Missal.

Major works 
 Mass of the Immaculate Conception,  
 Responsorial psalms for Sundays and major feast days of the three-year lectionary cycle. 
 Aifreann in onóir Muire, Máthair Dé : eagrán do phobal agus/nó cór  (Mass in honor of Mary, Mother of God)    
 Celtic alleluia : for SATB choir, descant, assembly, organ, guitar, solo instrument, trumpet or clarinet

References

Sources 
 Waterford People: A Biographical Dictionary By T. N. Fewer. Ballylough Books, Callaghane, Co Waterford,

1922 births
1981 deaths
Irish composers
20th-century composers